Nicolás "Nico" Antonio González (born 4 February 1992) is an Argentine footballer who plays as an attacking midfielder.

Honours

Club
Boca Juniors
 Argentine Primera División: 2011 Clausura

External links

Nicolás González at Football-Lineups

1992 births
Living people
Argentine footballers
Association football midfielders
Boca Juniors footballers
Estudiantes de Buenos Aires footballers
Chilean Primera División players
Unión La Calera footballers
Tercera División players
UD Las Palmas Atlético players
Argentine Primera División players
Argentine expatriate footballers
Argentine expatriate sportspeople in Chile
Argentine expatriate sportspeople in Spain
Expatriate footballers in Chile
Expatriate footballers in Spain
Footballers from Buenos Aires